Cratocentrus ruficornis is a species of wasp in the family Chalcididae. It is found in Namibia, South Africa and Zimbabwe.

References

External links 

 
 Cratocentrus ruficornis at insectoid.info

Chalcidoidea
Insects of Namibia
Insects of South Africa
Insects of Zimbabwe
Insects described in 1907